Newtownshandrum GAA is a Gaelic Athletic Association club located in the small village of Newtownshandrum in County Cork, Ireland. The club, situated in half a parish of about 800 people, was founded in 1896 and is almost exclusively concerned with the game of hurling.

In senior hurling Newtownshandrum compete annually in the Cork Senior Club Hurling Championship, which they have won four times as of 2009. The club, one of the few senior teams from the Avondhu division in the northern part of the county, also competes in various other championships in all grades within Cork.

Overview
The oldest piece of evidence which shows the existence of hurling in Newtownshandrum comes in the form of a medal inscribed 'Newtown Hurling Club 1896'. An old ballad is the first record of a Newtownshandrum hurling game played in nearby Milford. In spite of having a population of little more than 800 people, Newtownshandrum has become one of the most successful hurling clubs in Cork over the last decade, winning senior honours at Cork, Munster and All-Ireland levels.

History
2000: the big breakthrough

Four years after graduating from the intermediate grade, Newtownshandrum took the senior grade by storm and reached the championship decider in the top tier of Cork hurling. It was far from a ‘traditional’ final as one-time champions Erin's Own provided the opposition. It was east Cork versus north Cork, however, the club from the tiny parish of 800 triumphed on their first attempt in a county final, albeit in controversial circumstances as a late Erin's Own goal was disallowed. A 0–14 to 0–11 victory gave Newtownshandrum a county championship title in the senior grade. The county final victory was the highlight of the year as Newtown failed to make any impact in the subsequent Munster Senior Club Hurling Championship.

2002: county final defeat

After surrendering their county title in 2001, Newtownshandrum bounced back the following year to qualify for a chance to claim a second county title in three years. The task ahead of the club was immense as Blackrock, the kingpins of Cork hurling and the reigning champions, were the opponents on this occasion. Newtown gave a good account of themselves in that game, however, ‘the Rockies’ know-how sealed a 1–14 to 0–12 victory. This defeat for Newtownshandrum made their victory in 2000 look like a flash-in-the-pan.

2003-04: All-Ireland champions

In 2003 Newtownshandrum continued their dominance of the county club championship; however, they had yet to claim a second county title. The county final that year was a repeat of the 2002 decider when Newtown faced Blackrock once again. The stakes were high for both teams. A win for ‘the Rockies’ would give them a  third county title in-a-row, while a defeat for Newtownshandrum would surely undermine all the good work that had been done in getting the club into the senior ranks of the championship in the first place. On the day Newtownshandrum ran away with the victory. A 0–17 to 0–9 defeat of the mighty ‘Rockies’ cemented Newtown's reputation as a great team and also gave them a  second county title.

This victory allowed Newtown to represent Cork in the provincial club championship, with the tiny club even reaching the final. Patrickswell of Limerick provided the opposition on that occasion, however, history was made as Newtown claimed a 2–18 to 2–9 victory. It was the Newtownshandrum's first Munster club title, while the dream season continued.

The club championship season culminated on St. Patrick's Day, 2004 with an All-Ireland club final appearance.  Perennial runners-up Dunloy provided the opposition and had cause for optimism.  After a quiet outing in the Munster final Ciaran Herlihy made amends by scoring ten points of Newtown's tally of 0–17 and single-handedly beat the Antirm men who only recorded 1–6. It was yet another historic day for the north Cork parish as the ultimate prize of an All-Ireland club title was annexed.

2005-06: All-Ireland runner-up

After surrendering their county title at the semi-final stage in 2004, Newtownshandrum were back in the championship decider again in 2005.  Cloyne provided the opposition on that occasion, as the breakthrough teams continued to dominate.  The north Cork men, however, recorded an emphatic 0–15 to 0–9 victory over the east Cork side, giving the club a third county championship title of the decade.

Once again the tiny club went on the provincial march and lined out against Ballygunner.  Finbarr Reidy proved the scoring hero, chipping in with six points, to help his side to a narrow 0–16 to 1–12 victory over the Waterford champions.  It was Newtown's second Munster club winners' medal.

A second All-Ireland club final appearance beckoned with Portumna standing in the way of a second All-Ireland club medal.  Newtwon, however, were outclassed by a hungrier side as Newtown were defeated by 2–8 to 1–6.

2007: county final defeat again

In 2007 Newtownshandrum qualified for their fifth county championship final of the decade.  Reigning champions Erin's Own provided the opposition and successfully defended their title with a convincing 1–11 to 0–7 victory over the previous year's All-Ireland runners-up.  Once again it looked as if the Newtown fairytale had ended.

2009: the Cork team of the decade

At the start of the 2009 county championship few pundits gave Newtownshandrum a chance of claiming back the Seán Óg Murphy Cup. The team that had burst on the scene a decade earlier was now an ageing one, however, some younger players freshened things up somewhat.  After some convincing victories the north Cork club reached their sixth county final of the decade.  It was a clash of the past masters and the reigning champions as Sarsfield's attempted to retain their title for a second year in succession.  While a poor opening half saw little separating the sides Newtown went on the rampage in the second-half.  The final score of 3–22 to 1–12 was a complete surprise as the 10,000 spectators at Páirc Uí Chaoimh saw the tiny club battle back to the big-time.  Newtownshandrum's fourth county championship triumph from six county final appearances inside ten years cemented their reputation as the Cork team of the decade.

Honours
All-Ireland Senior Club Hurling Championships:
 Winner (1): 2004
 Runner-Up (1) 2006
Munster Senior Club Hurling Championships:
 Winner (3): 2003, 2006, 2009
Cork Senior Hurling Championships:
 Winner (4): 2000, 2003, 2005, 2009
 Runner-Up (2): 2002, 2007
Cork Intermediate Hurling Championships:
 Winner (4): 1953, 1976, 1981, 1996
 Runner-Up (3): 1947, 1949, 1978
Cork Junior Hurling Championships:
 Winner (2): 1946, 1968
 Runner-Up (2): 1940, 1992
Cork Minor Hurling Championships:
 Winner (0):
 Runner-Up (3): 1997, 2003, 2018
 Cork Premier 2 Minor Hurling Championship: 
 Winner (1) 2009
 Runner-Up (1) 2018Cork Minor A Hurling Championships: Winner (1): 1999
 Runner-Up (1): 1995Cork Under-21 Hurling Championships: Winner (5): 1973, 1998, 1999, 2000, 2010
 Runner-Up (1): 2006North Cork Junior A Hurling Championship: 9
 Winner (8):''' 1939, 1940, 1944, 1946, 1951, 1952, 1968, 1992, 2013
 Runner-Up (2): 1941, 1942

All-Ireland winning team 2003-04

Notable Players
Jerry O'Connor
Ben O'Connor
Paul Morsissey
John Paul King
Pat Mulcahy
Cathal Naugton
Jamie Coughlan
 Tim O'Mahony
 Cormac O'Brien

References

External links
Cork GAA site
Newtownshandrum GAA site

Gaelic games clubs in County Cork
Hurling clubs in County Cork